The knockout stage of the 1995–96 UEFA Champions League began on 6 March 1996 and ended with the final at the Stadio Olimpico in Rome on 22 May 1996. The top two teams from each of the four groups in the group stage competed in the knockout stage. The quarter-finals were predetermined with pairings being Group A vs Group B and Group C vs. Group D. A group winner would play the runners-up from the other group. For the semi-final the fixtures were also predetermined, with the ties containing the group winners of A and D playing each other, as well as those of groups B and C. The order of matches was decided by a draw.

Each quarter-final and semi-final was played over two legs, with each team playing one leg at home; the team that scored the most goals over the two legs qualified for the following round. In the event that the two teams scored the same number of goals over the two legs, the team that scored more goals away from home qualified for the next round; if both teams scored the same number of away goals, matches would go to extra time and then penalties if the teams could not be separated after extra time.

Bracket

Quarter-finals

|}

First leg

Second leg

Juventus won 2–1 on aggregate.

Nantes won 4–2 on aggregate.

Ajax won 3–0 on aggregate.

Panathinaikos won 3–0 on aggregate.

Semi-finals

|}

First leg

Second leg

Juventus won 4–3 on aggregate.

Ajax won 3–1 on aggregate.

Final

References

External links
Knockout phase at UEFA.com

Knockout Stage
1995-96